Habibabad (also Romanized as Ḩabībābād) is a city and capital of Habibabad District, in Borkhar County, Isfahan Province, Iran.  At the 2006 census, its population was 9,078, in 2,403 families.

References

Populated places in Borkhar County

Cities in Isfahan Province